FC Politehnica Chişinău was a Moldovan football club based in Chişinău. They played in the Divizia Naţională, the top division in Moldovan football.  Their home stadium was Dinamo Stadium.

Home colors were black and white with halved shirts and black shorts. Away colors were either white shirts and black shorts or all crimson shirts and shorts.

Previous names
 1965–2000 – FC Haiducul Sporting Hînceşti
 2000–2002 – FC Haiduc-Sporting-U.S.M. Chişinău
 Since 2002 – FC Politehnica-U.T.M. Chişinău

 
Association football clubs established in 1964
1964 establishments in the Moldavian Soviet Socialist Republic
University and college association football clubs
Association football clubs disestablished in 2017
Defunct football clubs in Moldova